Matthew Hammelmann (born 8 March 1996) is a former professional Australian rules footballer who played for the Brisbane Lions in the Australian Football League (AFL). He was drafted by the Brisbane Lions with their fourth selection and seventy-fifth overall in the 2015 AFL rookie draft. He debuted in the forty-two point loss against  in round 14, 2016. In October 2017, he was delisted by Brisbane.

Playing for Aspley in the 2021 VFL season, Hammelmann won the 'Frosty' Miller Medal as the leading goalkicker of the competition, kicking 42 goals from 10 matches.

References

External links 

Team Hammertime - Matthew Hammelmann Facebook Group

1996 births
Living people
Brisbane Lions players
Morningside Australian Football Club players
Australian rules footballers from Queensland
Redland Football Club players
Aspley Football Club players